Como San Giovanni railway station is the main station serving the city and comune of Como, in the region of Lombardy, northern Italy.  Opened in 1875, it forms part of the Milan–Chiasso railway, and is also a terminus of the Como–Lecco railway, which branches off the main line a few kilometres (miles) to the south, at Albate-Camerlata.

Como San Giovanni is the last Italian station on the line to Chiasso, and therefore fulfils the functions of a border station.  However, border checks have not been carried out there since 2008, when Switzerland joined the Schengen Agreement.

The station is currently managed by Rete Ferroviaria Italiana (RFI), but the commercial area of the passenger building is managed by Centostazioni.  Train services are operated by Trenitalia. Each of these companies is a subsidiary of Ferrovie dello Stato (FS), Italy's state-owned rail company.

Location
Como San Giovanni railway station is situated in Piazzale San Gottardo, a short distance to the west of the city centre.

History
The station was opened on 27 July 1875, upon the inauguration of the Albate–Como section of the Milan–Chiasso railway.

Features

The current passenger building was built after the destruction of World War II, to a design of Paolo Perilli.  It was inaugurated in 1949. A structure in brick on two levels (of which only the ground floor is accessible to travellers), it consists of three sections joined by a glass wall that provides much of the lighting inside the central hall.  It is also attached to shelters facing the station yard.

Inside the station yard, there are five through tracks, including four for use by passengers.  There are also three dock platforms on the south side of the station (used as the terminus of the line to Lecco) and two on the north side.

Each of the four through tracks dedicated to passenger transport has a platform covered by a concrete shelter.  The platforms are connected with each other by a covered walkway and elevators.  Track 1 is faced by the main platform, and tracks 2 and 3 by an island platform.  Track 4 is seldom used, but is accessible to passengers via a small platform between tracks 3 and 4.  To get to that platform, it is necessary to cross track 3.

There is also another track to the north serving the Como railway post office, and, to the south, two tracks connecting the station with its goods yard and the headquarters of the Customs Agency.

In 2008, work was completed on a facelift of the station co-financed by Centostazioni and RFI.  The project cost 1 million euros, and was subject to cultural heritage constraints.  The renovations included the following: restoration and maintenance of buildings, the addition of new businesses dedicated to travelers, the adaptation of plants to legal requirements, removal of architectural barriers, installation of tactile paving for the vision impaired, renovation of public conveniences and the construction of new lifts.

Passenger and train movements
The station has about 1.5 million passenger movements each year.

Como San Giovanni is the border station in Italy before trains enter Switzerland at Chiasso. Following the timetable change in December 2014, only one EuroCity Milan-Zürich train would call at Como instead of all services. The main destinations are Milano Centrale, Milano Porta Garibaldi, Molteno, Lecco, Albate-Camerlata, Bellinzona and Zürich Hauptbahnhof.

The station is also a stop on line S11 of the Milan suburban railway network (Milano Porta Garibaldi–Chiasso; hourly).

Train services
 the following services stop at Como San Giovanni:

 EuroCity: 

Interchange
In front of the passenger building is a small parking lot and a sign indicating the telephone numbers of taxis.

In the square, also in front of the passenger building, is a bus terminal. The operator of the bus service is SPT (Società Pubblica Trasporti, a name of ASF Autolinee), which runs services between 7.20 and 22.15.  The main destinations of buses are: Cernobbio, Moltrasio, Argegno, Menaggio, Dongo, San Fedele, Lanzo d'Intelvi, Torno, Asso, Bellagio, Palanzano, Cantù and Appiano Gentile.

Customs
Como San Giovanni is, for customs purposes, a border station for passengers arriving from Switzerland. Customs checks may be performed in the station. Systematic passport controls were abolished when Switzerland joined the Schengen Area in 2008.

See also

Como Lago railway station
List of railway stations in Lombardy
History of rail transport in Italy
Rail transport in Italy
Railway stations in Italy

References

External links

 Como San Giovanni – RFI

This article is based upon a translation of the Italian language version, and incorporates material from the German language version, as at January 2011.

San Giovanni Railway Station
Railway stations in Lombardy
Railway stations opened in 1875
1875 establishments in Italy
Milan S Lines stations
Railway stations in Italy opened in the 19th century